Spilomyia gussakovskii is a species of Hoverfly in the family Syrphidae.

Distribution
Tajikistan.

References

Eristalinae
Insects described in 1958
Diptera of Asia
Taxa named by Aleksandr Stackelberg